Barta or Bárta is a Hungarian, Slovak and Czech surname derived from a diminutive form of the personal name Bartolomaeus (Hungarian Bertalan; Czech Bartoloměj, from Latin Bartolomaeus). Czech and Slovak female Bártová, but Martina Bárta. Notable people with the surname include:

 Adam Barta (born 1979), American actor
 Aleš Bárta (born 1960), Czech organist 
 Alexander Barta (born 1983), German professional ice hockey centre
 Bernart de la Barta (fl. 1229), troubadour from La Barthe
 Bjorn Barta (born 1980), German professional ice hockey player
 Dan Bárta, Czech singer
 Franz Barta (born 1902), Austrian boxer
 Gary Barta (born 1963), athletic director at the University of Iowa
 Hilary Barta (born 1957), American comic book writer and artist
 István Barta (1895–1948), Hungarian water polo player
 Jan Bárta (born 1984), professional Czech road cyclist
 Jiří Barta (born 1948), Czech stop-motion animation director
 Jiří Bárta (1935–2012), Czech pianist and composer
 Josef Bárta (1744-1787), Czech composer
 Krisztina Barta (born 1991), Hungarian ice dancer
 Libor Barta (born 1967), Czech professional ice hockey player
 Lubor Bárta (1928–1972), Czech composer
 Martina Bárta
 Michal Bárta (born 1989), Czech football player
 Michal Bárta (ice hockey) (born 1987), Czech professional ice hockey player
 Nóra Barta (born 1984), Hungarian diver
 Sándor Barta (1897-1938), Hungarian poet
 Šimon Bárta, Czech Roman Catholic clergyman
 Steve Barta (born 1953), Brazilian jazz and post-bop pianist
 Tred Barta (1952–2019), American hunter, fisherman, and outdoorsman
 Vít Bárta (born 1973), former Czech Minister of Transport
 Vladimír Bárta, Czech judoka
 Zdeněk Bárta (1891–1987), Bohemian fencer

Bártová 
Daniela Bártová (born 1974), Czech athlete
Heidemarie Bártová (born 1965), Czech diver
Radka Bártová (born 1990), Slovak figure skater

Czech-language surnames
Hungarian-language surnames